Joseph Amico (born April 17, 1995) is an American professional soccer player who plays as a defender.

Career

College and youth
Amico played four years of college soccer, beginning as a freshman at the University of Central Florida, before transferring to Jacksonville University for their 2014 season onward. In 2016, Amico played with Premier Development League side Des Moines Menace without making an appearance.

Professional
On January 18, 2017, Amico signed with United Soccer League side Swope Park Rangers.

On February 16, 2018, Amico signed with Orange County SC for the 2018 season.

Amico moved to USL Championship side Oklahoma City Energy on January 7, 2020.

References

External links
 

1995 births
Living people
UCF Knights men's soccer players
Jacksonville Dolphins men's soccer players
Des Moines Menace players
Sporting Kansas City II players
Orange County SC players
OKC Energy FC players
Association football defenders
Soccer players from Indianapolis
USL Championship players
American soccer players